The Lick Creek Fire is a wildfire in Asotin and Garfield counties in Washington. The fire has so far burned  and is 97% contained.

The fire combined with the Dry Gulch Fire on July 8 and is being fought as one fire. The fire started due to lightning. The growth of the fire is currently slow. In early August, the Green Ridge Fire merged with the Lick Creek Fire. On August 9, 2021, it is estimated that the combined area is over 103,000 acres.

Events

July 
The Lick Creek Fire was first reported on July 7, 2021 at around 8:00 AM PDT.

August

Cause 
The cause of the fire is believed to be due to lightning.

Containment 
As of August 20, 2021, the fire is 97% contained.

Impact

Closures and Evacuations

References 

2021 meteorology
2021 Washington (state) wildfires
July 2021 events in the United States